Peter Derek Kircher (born 21 January 1945, Folkestone, Kent) is a retired English rock/pop drummer. Between 1982 and 1985 he was a member of Status Quo, performing with the band at Live Aid and on the albums Live at the N.E.C. and Back to Back.

Life and career

Kircher's style is rhythmic, and much of his work uses a low-tuned snare drum sound. As well as drums, Kircher contributed backing vocals to the bands he played with, and test pressings of a 1973 solo single – "Rockin' Lady" – are known to exist.

In the early 1960s, Kircher toured Germany doing club gigs as the drummer for The Burnettes, a band featuring Neil Landon as singer and Noel Redding playing guitar.  His earliest documented recordings are with Redding, who later played bass with Jimi Hendrix. More session work followed, before Kircher was recruited in April 1967 to join Honeybus, who although often written off as one-hit wonders, produced a sizeable body of baroque pop music which culminated in a critically acclaimed 1970 album, Story, which was released after the eventual dissolution of the band.

Less commercially successful work with Honeybus survives in the form of two albums, March Hare (credited to Colin Hare, the rhythm guitarist with Honeybus) and Into Your Ears, a solo album by Pete Dello, which were both released in 1971. Comparisons with Honeybus were inevitably drawn; the sessions bled into each other causing a reunion in all but name, and record company executives were  impressed by this new work that they commissioned an album, Recital, to be released under the Honeybus name.  Only test pressings of this exist, as a change in management at the label aborted the planned release.

The next excursion for Kircher's drumming was as a member of the band Shanghai, where he joined Mick Green from Johnny Kidd and the Pirates. The band produced two albums, released in 1974 and 1976, when the band supported Status Quo on the Blue for You tour. This, in turn, directly led to Kircher's induction into a group of session musicians for John Du Cann's The World's Not Big Enough album in 1977, which was produced by Quo's guitarist Francis Rossi.

After spending most of 1979 as the drummer in Liverpool Express and contributing to their third album LEX, Kircher was invited in 1979 to join Original Mirrors, a new wave band featuring Ian Broudie (later of the bands Care and Lightning Seeds) on guitar.  His time in this band took him up to 1981, taking in a session playing drums on the Nolan Sisters single "Who's Gonna Rock You", before being invited to join Status Quo following the resignation of John Coghlan.  Kircher's membership was announced in a press conference in January 1982.

Aside from recording some tracks with Rossi and Bernard Frost for their unreleased solo album Flying Debris in 1985, little has been heard from Kircher since, although Honeybus were briefly reunited for a Dutch TV show in 2003.  Kircher stated during an interview in this programme that he is now working as a signwriter, a profession he first started as a school leaver.

References

Status Quo (band) members
1945 births
Living people
English rock drummers
People from Folkestone
Musicians from Kent
People educated at The Harvey Grammar School
Beat musicians
Liverpool Express members